Zangebar (also Romanized as Zangebār, Zangabar, and Zangbār; also known as Zager, Zagra, and Zangīr) is a village in Azadlu Rural District, Muran District, Germi County, Ardabil Province, Iran. At the 2006 census, its population was 151, in 29 families.

References 

Towns and villages in Germi County